The 1979 season was Malmö FF's 68th in existence, their 46th season in Allsvenskan and their 43rd consecutive season in the league. They competed in Allsvenskan where they finished fourth, the 1978–79 European Cup where they finished as runners-up and the 1979–80 UEFA Cup where they were knocked out in the second round. Malmö FF also participated in two competitions in which the club continued playing in for the 1980 season, Svenska Cupen and the Intercontinental Cup. The season began with the first leg of the Quarter-finals of the European Cup on 7 March, league play started on 16 April and lasted until 28 October. The season ended with the first leg of the Intercontinental Cup on 18 November.

For the first time in the club's history, Malmö FF reached the final of the European Cup. They were defeated 1-0 by English team Nottingham Forest. As Forest turned down the chance to play in the Intercontinental Cup, Malmö FF took their place, and faced Paraguayan side Olimpia. The South American club won 3-1 on aggregate.

First-team squad
Squad at end of season

Competitions

Allsvenskan

League table

Matches

Svenska Cupen
The tournament continued into the 1980 season.

European Cup
The tournament continued from the 1978 season.

Quarter-finals

Semi-finals

Final

UEFA Cup

First round

Second round

Intercontinental Cup
The tournament continued into the 1980 season.

References

Malmö FF seasons
Malmo FF